Lubys may refer to:
Bronislovas Lubys (1938–2011), Lithuanian entrepreneur, former Prime Minister of Lithuania
Luby's, operates restaurants under the brands Luby's